John Anthony Epper (October 1, 1938 – July 20, 2012) was an American actor and stuntman. He was a member of the Epper family, whose members work as actors and stunt performers. Members include his sister, stuntwoman Jeannie Epper, and his brothers, Gary Epper and Andy Epper.

Epper, the son of stuntman John Epper, was born in Los Angeles, California. He began his stunt and acting career in the 1950s, performing as an uncredited actor in Carbine Williams in 1952, The Story of Will Rogers in 1952 and Ma and Pa Kettle at Home in 1954.

Epper alternated between stunt working and acting roles throughout his career. His stunt credits included Bram Stoker's Dracula, Con Air, Thelma & Louise, Jingle All the Way, Lethal Weapon 2, and Patriot Games. In addition to stunt work, Epper acted in numerous films including The Cowboys, Dick Tracy, The Beastmaster, Valdez Is Coming, National Lampoon's Christmas Vacation, The Scalphunters, Cutter's Way, and The Hitcher.

Epper's television work began in 1958 when he appeared in an episode of the sitcom Bachelor Father. He appeared in more than a dozen television series, including Batman, Charlie's Angels, MacGyver, and The A-Team. His last television role occurred in 1996, when he portrayed an inebriated Klingon in an episode of Star Trek: Deep Space Nine.

Personal life

Epper and his wife, Donna, had four children together: stuntman and actor Danny Epper; and three daughters, Traci, Rona and Casey.

Epper died from cancer at his Idaho home on July 20, 2012, at the age of 73.

Filmography

References

External links

1938 births
2012 deaths
American stunt performers
American male film actors
American male television actors
Deaths from cancer in Idaho